Naismith Award is a basketball award named after James Naismith, and awarded by the Atlanta Tipoff Club.

Naismith Awards include:
 Naismith College Player of the Year (men's and women's; NCAA Division I basketball)
 Naismith College Coach of the Year (men's and women's; NCAA Division I basketball)
 Naismith Defensive Player of the Year (men's and women's; NCAA Division I basketball)
 Naismith Prep Player of the Year (male and female)
 Naismith College Official of the Year (men's and women's)
 Naismith Legacy Award, "presented to players, coaches and other individuals or organizations from the game of basketball honoring their role in furthering the values of honor, respect and integrity -- both on an off the court."

Another "Naismith Award", defunct since 2013, was not administered by the Atlanta Tipoff Club, and was named after John Naismith's daughter-in-law Frances Pomeroy Naismith:
 Frances Pomeroy Naismith Award — NCAA Division I basketball; men's award, handed out by the National Association of Basketball Coaches, was restricted to players no taller than 6 ft/1.83 m, and women's award, handed out by the Women's Basketball Coaches Association, was restricted to players no taller than 5 ft 8 in/1.73 m

References

External links
 Naismith Awards

College basketball trophies and awards in the United States
Basketball trophies and awards